Francesco Carletti (1573 – 1636) was a Florentine merchant, explorer and writer.

He was the first private traveler to circumnavigate the globe (1594-1602). He left with his father, Antonio Carletti, a merchant, to the islands of Cape Verde to buy African slaves to be sold in the West Indies. From there went to the Spanish colonies in Panama, Mexico, Colombia, Peru and again to Mexico. They sailed from Acapulco to the Philippines in the Manila galleon and arrived on the island of Luzon, where they remained one year. 

Then they moved to Japan and China, where his father Antonio died in 1598. Left alone, Francesco went to India and came to Goa, home to the Portuguese viceroy, where he remained for some time. 

Taken by homesickness, he loaded on a Portuguese ship all his merchandise and sailed to Portugal. On the island of St. Helena he was attacked and his wealth plundered by Dutch ships. He eventually returned to Florence without his accumulated wealth. The Grand Duke Ferdinand I, who had protected him during the journey, took him to court. Francesco Carletti collected his travel experiences in twelve Arguments, dedicated to Ferdinand I.

Works and translations
In Italian: Francesco Carletti: Ragionamenti di Francesco Carletti Fiorentino sopra le cose da lui vedute ne’ suoi viaggi si dell’ Indie Occidentali, e Orientali Come d’altri Paesi. 
 Into German: Francesco Carletti: Reise um die Welt 1594: Erlebnisse eines Florentiner Kaufmanns. Aus d. Italien. übertr. von Ernst Bluth. Herrenalb/Schwarzwald: Erdmann, 1966 
 Into English: Francesco Carletti "My Voyage Around the World" Random House, New York, 1964. 
 Into Dutch: Francesco Carletti "Reis om de Wereld" Translanted by Jo Verhaart-Bodderij, Kruseman Den Haag 1958

References

External links 

 

1573 births
1636 deaths
Businesspeople from Florence
Italian explorers
Italian travel writers
17th-century Italian businesspeople
16th-century Italian businesspeople
16th-century travel writers
17th-century travel writers
Slave traders